Kiler (English: The Hitman) is a 1997 Polish comedy by Juliusz Machulski, starring Cezary Pazura, Jerzy Stuhr, Janusz Rewiński, Jan Englert, Katarzyna Figura and Małgorzata Kożuchowska. The movie is a story of a taxi driver named Jerzy (short: Jurek) Kiler who is mistaken for a notorious mercenary killer by the police as well as the mafia. The film has a sequel; Kiler-ów 2-óch.

Remake 
Seeing the movie's tremendous success in Poland, two film studios from the United States started negotiations to buy the rights to make an English version of the film: Hollywood Pictures offering $600 000, and 20th Century Studios, $10 000. The rights were sold to Hollywood Pictures who paid half of the many on the spot and agreed to pay the rest after the end of film production. Barry Josephson were planet to be the producer, and Barry Levinson, the director. The original director of Polish film, Juliusz Machulski was planned to be the executive producer. After the poor reception of Wild Wild West made by Josephson and Levinson, two stopped working together, putting aside the possibility of working on the film adaptation. Barry Sonnenfeld was also interested in directing the movie. Jim Carrey and Will Smith were rumored to be considered to portray the main character of the film The film was set to happen in New York City, with the plot revolving around a taxi driver who accidentally got confused for the world-famous hitman. The production was meant to be appropriated into the American market and had different than original, humour. The production of the film was planned to start in 1999 or 2000, however it never happened. In 2007, the studio responsible for the production was disestablished.

Cast
Cezary Pazura – Jerzy Kiler
Małgorzata Kożuchowska – Ewa Szańska
Jerzy Stuhr – Jerzy Ryba
Janusz Rewiński – Stefan "Siara" Siarzewski
Katarzyna Figura – Ryszarda "Gabrysia" Siarzewska
Jan Englert – Ferdynand Lipski
Krzysztof Kiersznowski – "Wąski"
Marek Kondrat – director Mieczysław Klonisz
Jan Machulski – Zenek
Sławomir Sulej – "Kudłaty"
Piotr Wawrzyńczak – "Iks"
Lech Dyblik – "Wstrętny"
Władysław Komar – "Uszat"
Paweł Deląg – Jarosław
Marcin Figurski – Stanisław
Alex Murphy – Hector Sosa
Szymon Majewski – Mioduch
Paweł Wawrzecki – UOP officer
Mirosław Zbrojewicz – UOP officer
Maciej Kozłowski – prosecutor
Olaf Lubaszenko – himself
Joanna Janikowska – Evita
Sławomir Orzechowski – the real Kiler
Małgorzata Drozd – secretary
Cezary Żak – barman

See also
Polish cinema

References

External links 
 

1997 films
Polish comedy films
1990s Polish-language films
Films directed by Juliusz Machulski
1997 comedy films